Cedar County is a county in the U.S. state of Nebraska. As of the 2010 United States Census, the population was 8,852. The county seat is Hartington. The county was formed in 1857, and was named for the Cedar tree groves in the area.

In the Nebraska license plate system, Cedar County is represented by the prefix 13 (it had the 13th-largest number of vehicles registered in the county when the license plate system was established in 1922).

Geography

Cedar County is on the northern edge of Nebraska. Its north boundary abuts the south boundary line of the state of South Dakota, across the Missouri River.

Major highways

  U.S. Highway 20
  U.S. Highway 81
  Nebraska Highway 12
  Nebraska Highway 15
  Nebraska Highway 57
  Nebraska Highway 59
  Nebraska Highway 84
  Nebraska Highway 121

Adjacent counties

 Clay County, South Dakota - northeast
 Dixon County - east
 Wayne County - southeast
 Pierce County - southwest
 Knox County - west
 Yankton County, South Dakota - northwest

Protected areas

 Audubon Bend Wildlife Area
 Calumet Bluff
 Chalkrock State Wildlife Management Area
 Cottonwood Recreation Area
 Missouri National Recreational River (part)
 Bow Creek Recreation Area
 Meridian Bridge
 Nebraska Tailwaters Recreation Area
 Tatanka State Wildlife Management Area (part)
 Training Dike Recreation Area
 Wiseman State Wildlife Management Area

Lakes
 Chalkrock Lake
 Lewis and Clark Lake (part)

Demographics

As of the 2000 United States Census there were 9,615 people, 3,623 households, and 2,565 families in the county. The population density was 13 people per square mile (5/km2). There were 4,200 housing units at an average density of 6 per square mile (2/km2). The racial makeup of the county was 99.07% White, 0.10% Black or African American, 0.20% Native American, 0.04% Asian, 0.01% Pacific Islander, 0.18% from other races, and 0.40% from two or more races.  0.43% of the population were Hispanic or Latino of any race. 69.8% were of German and 5.1% American ancestry.

There were 3,623 households, out of which 34.80% had children under the age of 18 living with them, 63.60% were married couples living together, 4.30% had a female householder with no husband present, and 29.20% were non-families. 27.00% of all households were made up of individuals, and 15.70% had someone living alone who was 65 years of age or older.  The average household size was 2.60 and the average family size was 3.20.

The county population contained 29.40% under the age of 18, 6.00% from 18 to 24, 24.20% from 25 to 44, 20.30% from 45 to 64, and 20.00% who were 65 years of age or older. The median age was 39 years. For every 100 females there were 100.10 males. For every 100 females age 18 and over, there were 97.10 males.

The median income for a household in the county was $33,435, and the median income for a family was $39,422. Males had a median income of $26,707 versus $18,370 for females. The per capita income for the county was $15,514. About 6.30% of families and 9.10% of the population were below the poverty line, including 10.70% of those under age 18 and 9.70% of those age 65 or over.

Communities

Cities
 Hartington (county seat)
 Laurel
 Randolph

Villages

 Belden
 Coleridge
 Fordyce
 Magnet
 Obert
 St. Helena
 Wynot

Census-designated places
 Aten
 Bow Valley

Unincorporated communities

 Constance
 Menominee
 St. James
 South Yankton

Politics
Cedar County voters are strongly Republican. In only one national election since 1936 has the county selected the Democratic Party candidate (as of 2020).

See also

 National Register of Historic Places listings in Cedar County, Nebraska

External links
 Cedar County, Nebraska - Official Site

References

 
Nebraska counties on the Missouri River
1857 establishments in Nebraska Territory
Populated places established in 1857